Alexander Mronz and Greg Van Emburgh were the defending champions, but did not participate this year.

Scott Davis and Broderick Dyke won the title, defeating Brian Garrow and Sven Salumaa 2–6, 6–4, 6–4 in the final.

Seeds

  Grant Connell /  Glenn Michibata (first round)
  Neil Broad /  Stefan Kruger (first round)
  Scott Davis /  Broderick Dyke (champions)
  Steve DeVries /  Richard Matuszewski (first round)

Draw

Draw

References
Draw

OTB Open
1989 Grand Prix (tennis)